A horror fiction magazine is a magazine that publishes primarily horror fiction with the main purpose of frightening the reader.  Horror magazines can be in print, on the internet, or both.

Major horror magazines

Defunct magazines

The Arkham Collector, 1967–1971
The Arkham Sampler, 1948–1949
The Australian Horror and Fantasy Magazine
Bizarre Fantasy Tales, 1970–1971
Castle of Frankenstein, 1962–1975, 1999–2002
Coven 13, 1969–1970
Dark Fluidity, 2001–2004
Deathrealm, 1987–1997
Eerie Stories, 1937
Fear!, 1960
Ghost Stories, 1926–1932
The Haunt of Horror, 1973
H. P. Lovecraft's Magazine of Horror, 2006–2009
Horror Stories, 1935–1941
Macabre Cadaver, 2008–2011
Magazine of Horror, 1963–1971
Night Cry, 1984–1987
Der Orchideengarten, 1919–1921, Germany
Paradox Magazine, 2003–07
Prize Ghost Stories, 1963
Shadowed Realms, 2004–06
Shock, 1948, 1960–1963
Strange Stories, 1939–1941
Strange Tales, 1946
Strange Tales of Mystery and Terror, 1931–1933
Tales of Terror from the Beyond, 1964
Terror Australis, 1988–1992
Terror Tales, 1934–1941
The Third Alternative, 1994–2005
True Twilight Tales, 1963–1964
Twilight Zone, literature, 1981–1989
Uncanny Stories, 1941
Uncanny Tales, 1939–1943
Web Terror Stories, 1962–1965
Weird Tales, 1923–2014
Weird Terror Tales, 1969–1970
Whispers, 1971–1997
Witchcraft & Sorcery, 1971–1974

Extant magazines
Abyss & Apex
Andromeda Spaceways Inflight Magazine
Apex Digest
Bards and Sages Quarterly
Black Static
Blood Magazine
Cemetery Dance
Chizine, webzine
Clarkesworld Magazine, webzine
Dark Moon Digest
Fantázia
Fever Dreams Magazine
GUD Magazine, 2006–present, print/pdf
Hello Horror
The Horror Zine
Hypnos
Ideomancer
The Magazine of Fantasy & Science Fiction
Midnight Street
Not one of us
Shock Totem Magazine
Shroud: The Journal of Dark Fiction and Art
Something Wicked
Subterranean Magazine, webzine
Three-lobed Burning Eye, 1999–present, online/anthology
Twisted Tongue magazine

Horror comic magazines
Creepy (Warren Publications)
Eerie (Warren Publications)
Nightmare (Skywald Publications)
Psycho (Skywald Publications)
Scream (Skywald Publications)
Vampirella (Warren Publications)
Weird (Myron Fass/Eerie Publications)

See also 
 Fantasy fiction magazine
 Science fiction magazine

References

 
Lists of magazines